Novovoznesenka is a rural locality (a settlement) in Dalny Selsoviet, Rubtsovsky District, Altai Krai, Russia. The population was 73 as of 2013. There are 3 streets.

Geography 
Novovoznesenka is located 50 km east Rubtsovsk (the district's administrative centre) by road. Cheburikha is the nearest rural locality.

References 

Rural localities in Rubtsovsky District